Elías Bladimir Montes Alfaro (born December 25, 1973 in San Salvador) is a Salvadoran professional football player.

His position is striker or forward.

Club career
Montes started his career at Tiburones before joining Salvadoran giants Alianza in 1996. Montes came second in goal scoring in the 1998-99 season when with Alianza FC. He left them to move abroad in 1999 but returned to El Salvador for the 2001-02 season after two seasons in the US with the Boston Bulldogs. On his return at Alianza he was primarily being used as a sub so he left them for a spell at Second Division side Coca-Cola scoring loads of goals and whom he led to the Premier Division.

After switching clubs several times more in the years thereafter he signed for Marte in 2011.

International career
Montes made his debut for El Salvador in an August 1996 friendly match against Honduras and has earned a total of 32 caps, scoring 7 goals. He was part of the national football team for the 1998 and 2002 World Cup campaigns and has represented his country in 10 FIFA World Cup qualification matches and played at the 1997 and 1999 UNCAF Nations Cups.

His final international game was a September 2000 World Cup qualification match against Honduras.

References

External links
http://www.elgrafico.com/especiales/hg/plata08.html

1973 births
Living people
Sportspeople from San Salvador
Association football forwards
Salvadoran footballers
El Salvador international footballers
Alianza F.C. footballers
Boston Bulldogs (soccer) players
C.D. Luis Ángel Firpo footballers
Once Municipal footballers
C.D. Atlético Marte footballers
A.D. Isidro Metapán footballers
Salvadoran expatriate footballers
Expatriate soccer players in the United States
Salvadoran expatriate sportspeople in the United States
USL First Division players